The Tonga national football team represents the country of Tonga in international association football. It is fielded by Tonga Football Association, the governing body of football in Tonga, and competes as a member of the Oceania Football Confederation (OFC), which encompasses the countries of Oceania. Tonga played their first international match on 29 August 1979 in an 8–0 loss to Tahiti in Suva.

Tonga have competed in numerous competitions, and all players who have played in at least one international match, either as a member of the starting eleven or as a substitute, are listed below. Each player's details include his playing position while with the team, the number of caps earned and goals scored in all international matches, and details of the first and most recent matches played in. The names are initially ordered by number of caps (in descending order), then by date of debut, then by alphabetical order. All statistics are correct up to and including the match played on 18 July 2019.

Key

Players

References

Tonga international footballers
Association football player non-biographical articles